Deshaipet is a village in Warangal district, Telangana, India.

References 

Villages in Hanamkonda district